, also known as , was a Japanese poet in the Imperial court's waka tradition. She also had a daughter with Prince Atsuyoshi called Nakatsukasa.

Her poems were emblematic of the changing styles of the time, and 22 of them were included in the Kokin Wakashū. 

One of her poems was included in the Ogura Hyakunin Isshu.

Poems

References

External links 

 
 
 
 

870s births
930s deaths
Year of birth uncertain
Year of death uncertain
Kuge
10th-century Japanese women writers
10th-century Japanese writers
Japanese women poets
10th-century Japanese poets
Hyakunin Isshu poets